You Gentiles is a 1924 book written by Romanian-born British and American-Jewish author Maurice Samuel. It discusses points of difference in behavior between Jews and Gentiles focusing on physical activity, religion, concepts of good and evil, loyalty, science, fair play, and discipline.  The work contains some controversial statements: as an example, under "We, The Destroyers", Samuel writes, "We Jews, we, the destroyers, will remain the destroyers for ever. Nothing that you will do will meet our needs and demands. We will for ever destroy because we need a world of our own, a God-world, which it is not in your nature to build. . . . The wretched fate which scattered us through your midst has thrust this unwelcome role upon us."

Reviews

References

External links 

1924 books
Harcourt (publisher) books
Jewish literature
Jewish socialism